Shorea trapezifolia is a species of plant in the family Dipterocarpaceae. It is endemic to Sri Lanka.

Culture
Known as තිනිය දුන් (tiniya dun) in Sinhala.

References

trapezifolia
Endemic flora of Sri Lanka
Trees of Sri Lanka
Critically endangered flora of Asia
Taxonomy articles created by Polbot